Johanna Antoinette Petronella ("Saskia") van Hintum (born 24 April 1970 in Vught, North Brabant) is a retired female volleyball player and later coach from the Netherlands, who represented her place of origin/ native country at the 1996 Summer Olympics in Atlanta, Georgia, finishing in fifth place.

References
  Dutch Olympic Committee

1970 births
Living people
Dutch women's volleyball players
Volleyball players at the 1996 Summer Olympics
Olympic volleyball players of the Netherlands
People from Vught